Arun Kumar Yadav may refer to:

 Arun Kumar Yadav (Saharsa politician) (born 1950), Indian politician
 Arun Kumar Yadav (Uttar Pradesh politician) (born 1980), Indian politician
 Arun Kumar Yadav (Bhojpur politician) (born 1965)